Nerja is a municipality on the Costa del Sol in the province of Málaga in the autonomous community of Andalusia in southern Spain. It is part of the comarca of La Axarquía. It is on the country's southern Mediterranean coast, about 50 km east of Málaga.

Under Muslim rule, its name was Narixa, which means "abundant source" and is the origin of the current name.

History
Nerja has a long history, evidenced by the primitive paintings found in its famous Nerja caves, discovered in 1959. These caves are now believed to be just one entrance to a linked series of sinkholes stretching many miles into the mountains between Nerja and Granada, and which may yet prove to be one of the most extensive unexplored systems in Europe. Visitors to the caves will be able to view the remains of one of the ancient inhabitants of Nerja.

The Romans built three settlements here, including Detunda, of which now large remains can be seen. The area was later taken over by the Arabs in the early 8th century. Under the Moors, the town was known as  Narixa, which means "abundant spring", from which the present name derives.

Its agricultural and silk products are said to have been famed throughout the Muslim world and in the markets of Damascus as early as the 10th century.

The Balcón de Europa, a mirador or viewpoint which gives views across the sea, is in the centre of the old town. Its name is popularly believed to have been coined by King Alfonso XII, who visited the area in 1885 following a disastrous earthquake and was captivated by the scene. Local folklore says that he stood upon the site where the Balcón now stands, and said "This is the balcony of Europe". Local archive documents are said to show that its name predated this visit, but this has not prevented the authorities from placing a life-sized (and much photographed) statue of the king standing by the railing.

The Balcón area was originally known as La Batería, a reference to the gun battery which existed there in a fortified tower. This emplacement and a similar tower nearby were destroyed during the Peninsular War. In May 1812, the British vessels Hyacinth, Termagant and Basilisk supported Spanish guerrillas on the coast of Granada, against the French. On 20 May, Termagant or Hyacinth opened fire and the forts were destroyed. Two rusty guns positioned at the end of the Balcón are reminders of these violent times. The huge lumps of rock, the remains of La Batería, visible in the sea at the end of the Balcón, are further evidence of this action.

Main sights
 Caves of Nerja
 Sierras of Tejeda, Almijara and Alhama Natural Park
 Navachica, highest peak in the Sierra de Almijara
Balcón de Europa
The Aqueduct, built in the 19th century
Baroque Hermitage of las Angustias (17th century)
Church of El Salvador, in Baroque and Mudéjar style (17th century)
Maro, a coastal village within Nerja's municipal term
Chillar River
 Frigiliana, a village on the nearby mountain

Beaches

 Burriana
 Carabeillo
 Carabeo
Chucho
Torrecilla
El Salón
Playazo
Calahonda
Caletilla

Sports 
 Enrique López Cuenca Sports Stadium -
Combined Rugby and Athletics stadium, home to the local rugby (union) side Club Nerja Rugby. Local semi-professional soccer team  C.D Nerja  (Club Deportivo Nerja) used to play at the stadium but now have a purpose built ground behind the Medico.

 Watersports

Sea-Kayaking and Scuba-diving are based at Burriana beach

 Racket Sports
Padel and Tennis are based at Club de Tenis y Padel la Raqueta a short walk from the centre of town

Public transport 

Nerja is not integrated in the Málaga Metropolitan Transport Consortium.

As well as two local bus routes, around town (from the Riú Mónica Hotel), there are buses from the top of the High Street by the Alsa ticket office to Málaga, Caves of Nerja, Frigiliana, Maro, Almuñécar, Vélez-Málaga, Torre del Mar, Granada, Córdoba, Seville, Almería and Motril.

Twin towns

 Pescia, Italy
 San Juan, Argentina

Cultural references

Nerja has been a source of inspiration for expatriate writers and artists, such as Scottish novelist Joan Lingard and French-born author André Launay; Jorge Guillén and Federico García Lorca were long-time visitors and residents of the town.
The town was also the main setting for the filming of Verano azul, a popular Spanish television series later exported to several countries, a replica of the boat featured in the series can be found in a park of the same name (as the series), near the centre of town.

In popular fiction
The Enigmatic Mr Phelps (pub.1997-2003-2005), which combines the first two international crime fiction novels in a continuing series along with a screenplay Mr Phelps (2016 - co-written by Award-winning Canadian Film Director and screenwriter Jason C. Bourque), created for a motion picture adaptation by Canada-based English international crime writer David B. Green, are set in Nerja during the mid 1990s. The stories include many references to Nerja and the Axarquia region and focus upon a fictional bar/restaurant located on c/Carabeo. The fictional character of "Phelps" is often confused with the real life of the author who himself lived in Nerja between 1995 and 1998.

Media 
The town has a  commercial Spanish-language pop radio station Radio Nerja

See also
 Caves of Nerja
 Verano azul

References

External links

 Official website 
 Cueva de Nerja The Nerja Caves (Spanish only)
 Malaga Area Metropolitan Transport Consortium